Alasdair Mór mac Domhnaill was a younger son of Domhnall mac Raghnaill—the eponymous ancestor of Clan Donald. He first appears on record in 1253, when it is recorded as witnessing a charter by his brother, Aonghus Mór, to Paisley Abbey. According to the 19th century Clan Donald historians Angus and Archibald Macdonald, Alasdair Mór must have been a prominent man as he is the only recorded brother of Aonghus Mór. He is recorded in the Annals of Connacht, in the year 1299, as being a man noted for being a "generous and bounteous man". In that year he was slain in a conflict with Alasdair of Argyll and the MacDougalls. He is said to have had at least five sons: Dòmhnall, Gòraidh, Donnchadh, Eoin and Eachann. Alasdair Mòr was succeeded in the representation of his clan by Dòmhnall. Today he is considered to be the eponymous ancestor of Clan MacAlister.

References

Clan MacAlister
Medieval Gaels from Scotland
People from Argyll and Bute
13th-century Scottish people
Year of birth unknown